The Village in the Treetops (lit. The Aerial Village) is a 1901 novel by French author Jules Verne.  The book, one of Verne's Voyages extraordinaires, is his take on Darwinism and human development.

Publication history
1964, UK, London, Arco, 191 pp.

References
Jules Verne Rediscovered: Didacticism and the Scientific Novel by Arthur B. Evans.
Human Prehistory in Fiction by Charles De Paolo.

External links

 Le Village aérien available at Jules Verne Collection 

1901 French novels
1901 fantasy novels
Novels by Jules Verne
Prehistoric people in popular culture
Lost world novels